Andrés Felipe Ortiz (born March 20, 1987) is a Colombian footballer that plays for Independiente Medellín.

He can play as central defender. He was a starter on the Colombia U-20 team that failed to qualify for the 2007 World Cup.

References

External links
 BDFA profile 
 

1987 births
Living people
Colombian footballers
Independiente Medellín footballers
Association football defenders
Footballers from Medellín